Spincourt is a commune in the Meuse department in Grand Est in north-eastern France.

Geography
The village lies on the right bank of the Othain, which flows northwestward through the south-western part of the commune.

See also
Communes of the Meuse department

References

Communes of Meuse (department)